Gonatozygon is a genus of green algae, specifically of the Gonatozygaceae.

References

Scientific references

Scientific databases

 
 AlgaTerra database
 Index Nominum Genericorum

Desmidiales
Charophyta genera